Sidi Okba District is a district of Biskra Province, Algeria.

Municipalities
The district has 4 municipalities:
Sidi Okba
Chetma
El Haouch
Aïn Naga

In Sidi Okba there is a tomb in the Al-Shurafa cemetery in which the old leader Abu al-Muhajir Dinar is buried together with 300 other people. He was the emir of the Umayyad empire.

References

Districts of Biskra Province